William Wallace Smith ( – ) was a grandson of Joseph Smith Jr. and Prophet-President of the Reorganized Church of Jesus Christ of Latter Day Saints (now known as Community of Christ), from October 6, 1958, to April 5, 1978, when he retired to "emeritus" status.

Biography
W. Wallace Smith was born in Lamoni, Iowa, on November 18, 1900, to Joseph Smith III and his third wife Ada R. Clark.  Smith graduated from the University of Missouri in 1924. He entered the ministry of the RLDS Church in 1928 and was ordained an apostle and joined the Council of Twelve Apostles on April 7, 1947, after the honorable release of John W. Rushton.  On April 2, 1950, Smith was called as counselor to Israel A. Smith, his half brother, in the First Presidency, and was replaced in the Quorum of the Twelve by Donald O. Chesworth. Smith died in Independence, Missouri on August 4, 1989.

President of the Church

Smith was the third of his father's sons to succeed to the presidency of the church, assuming the presidency after the deaths of his brothers Frederick M. Smith and Israel A. Smith.

Church Growth

Following a 1960 worldwide missionary tour, W. Wallace Smith's tenure as church president saw substantial overseas growth in the church, especially in Africa, Latin America, and the Far East. Also during his administration, the church saw significant doctrinal and practical changes, characterized by vigorous efforts in ecumenism, liberalism and internationalization of the group's message.

The Independence Temple of Zion

The building of temples is part of the overall tradition of the Latter Day Saint movement. For several decades the idea of building of an "Independence Temple of Zion" had been part of RLDS Church tradition.  However, nothing specific had been said or done by the leadership of the RLDS Church for several decades. In 1972, W. Wallace brought the concept to the forefront in a document that called for "defining the purpose and selecting the place for erecting a temple."

Breaking with lineal succession

In 1958, instead of calling Lynn Smith to replace his father in the office of Presiding Patriarch, W. Wallace Smith named Roy Cheville to the office, in a break with an RLDS traditional doctrine of lineal succession.

Retirement
Smith designated his son, Wallace B. Smith as his successor in 1976, and on April 5, 1978, he became the first president of the church to retire to "emeritus" status — all previous presidents had served until their deaths.   To ensure a smooth transition, W.W. Smith read a letter of resignation shortly before his son was ordained.

References

Other sources
Richard P. Howard, The Church Through the Years, Herald House: 1992.

External links
 

1900 births
1989 deaths
American Latter Day Saints
American leaders of the Community of Christ
Apostles of the Community of Christ
Doctrine and Covenants people
Members of the First Presidency (Community of Christ)
People from Lamoni, Iowa
Prophet-Presidents of the Community of Christ
Religious leaders from Iowa
Smith family (Latter Day Saints)
University of Missouri alumni